Álvaro Esquivel (born 16 April 1998) is a Costa Rican professional BMX cyclist. Esquivel was born in Ciudad Neily, but he grew up in Vito Coto Brus, a commune in the province of Puntarenas.

Esquivel made his professional debut at the national level in 2019. He has won several Best Trick trophies, including one at the O Marisquiño festival in Spain, and two at the BMX Street Station tournament in France. Esquivel reached the final at the Simple Session in Estonia, placing 15th.

He has also represented Costa Rica in international competitions, and in 2022 became champion of the pro street category at the Copa Latina 2022 held in Mexico.

Contest history

2022 
 
 1st BMX Copa Latina in Mexico.

References

External links
 Profile at DIG BMX 
 Profile at Instagram 
 Profile at YouTube 
 
1998 births 
Living people 
BMX riders 
Costa Rican male cyclists